Loge may refer to:

Places
Loge-Fougereuse, a village and municipality in the Vendée department of France
La Loge, Pas-de-Calais, a municipality in the Pas-de-Calais department of France 
La Loge-Pomblin, a municipality in the Aube department of France
La Loge-aux-Chèvres, a municipality in the Aube department of France
Small trading stations of French India

Other uses
Loge (moon), a natural satellite of Saturn
Loki (German: Loge), a minor god in Norse mythology who alternately helps and opposes the other gods
Logi (mythology) (Swedish: Loge), the personification of fire in Norse mythology
Loge, a character in Richard Wagner's Der Ring des Nibelungen that synthesizes both Loki and Logi
La Loge, an 1874 painting by Pierre-Auguste Renoir also known as The Theatre Box 
Box (theatre), also known as loge, a small, separated seating area in the auditorium for a limited number of people

See also
 Loki (disambiguation)
 Logi (disambiguation)